, (born August 30, 1955) is a former Japanese baseball player of the Hiroshima Toyo Carp of Japan's Central League.

He was one of the most famous Japanese left-handed pitchers.

He was born in Izumo, Shimane.

He led his team into five Japan Series and winning three title (1979, 1980 and 1984).

Career
1st pitch on September 4, 1977.
1st win on August 12, 1978.
Best ERA (1988 and 1997).
Relief Man of the Year Award winner (1991).
Greatest Number of Saves (1991 and 1992).
Sawamura Award winner (1988).
148 W, 138 S, 59 CG, 19 Shutout and 1733 K.
Hiroshima Carp Pitching Coach (1999).
Japan national baseball team Pitching Coach at the Athens Olympics (2003–2004).
Japan national baseball team Pitching Coach at the Beijing Olympics (2007–2008).

statistics

See also
Eiji Sawamura Award
List of Nippon Professional Baseball ERA champions

External links

 Career statistics - NPB.jp 
his winning pitch for 1991 Central League Champion (youtube.com)
his last pitch (youtube.com)

1955 births
Living people
Baseball people from Shimane Prefecture
Japanese baseball players
Nippon Professional Baseball pitchers
Hiroshima Toyo Carp players
Japanese baseball coaches
Nippon Professional Baseball coaches
Japanese Baseball Hall of Fame inductees